Formidable may refer to:

Music

Albums
Formidable (La Toya Jackson album), 1992 or the title song
Formidable (Pat Martino album), 2017
Formidable, by Oui Oui, 1991
Formidable...!, by Bernard Peiffer, 2006
Gabar (Formidable), by Abdel Halim Hafez, 1967

Songs
"Formidable" (song), by Stromae, 2013
"Formidable", by Twenty One Pilots from Scaled and Icy, 2021
"Formidable", written by Charles Trenet

Ships
Formidable-class frigate, Republic of Singapore Navy
French ship Formidable, six ships, including:
French ship Formidable (1751), an 80-gun ship of the line
French ship Formidable (1795), later HMS Belleisle, a 74-gun third rate
French ship Formidable (1795), an 80-gun ship of the line
French ironclad Formidable, launched 1885
HMS Formidable, five ships, including:
HMS Formidable (1777), a 98-gun second rate man-of-war
HMS Formidable (1825), an 84-gun second rate
HMS Formidable (1898), a pre-dreadnought battleship
Formidable-class battleship, a four-ship class named for the 1898 ship
HMS Formidable (67), an aircraft carrier

Sports
Formidable (horse) (1975–1997), a Thoroughbred racehorse

See also
Fourmidables, a Spanish barbershop quartet